Aarón Rey Sánchez (born 19 May 1998) is a Spanish footballer who plays for CE Sabadell FC as a forward.

Club career
Born in Ferrol, A Coruña, Galicia, Rey joined Racing de Ferrol's youth setup in 2015, from SCDR Galicia de Caranza. On 3 April 2016, aged just 17, he made his first team debut by playing the last 15 minutes of a 0–0 Segunda División B home draw against CD Tudelano.

On 10 July 2016, Rey joined RC Celta de Vigo and returned to the youth setup. Promoted to the reserves for the 2017–18 season, he was sparingly used before signing for CE Sabadell FC on 25 July 2019; with the latter side, he achieved promotion to Segunda División in 2020.

Rey made his professional debut on 27 September 2020, starting in a 0–1 away loss against RCD Mallorca.

References

External links

1998 births
Living people
Footballers from Ferrol, Spain
Spanish footballers
Association football wingers
Segunda División players
Segunda División B players
Racing de Ferrol footballers
Celta de Vigo B players
CE Sabadell FC footballers